Panaah is a 1992 Indian Hindi-language  action masala film directed by Krishnakant Pandya. It stars Naseeruddin Shah, Siddharth Ray, Kiran Kumar, Praveen Kumar and Pallavi Joshi in pivotal roles. Film was successful at the box office.

Cast
 Naseeruddin Shah as Devaa
 Praveen Kumar as Bheema
 Siddharth Ray as Jeeva
 Jeet Upendra as Rama
 Pallavi Joshi as Priyanka Kulkarni
 Pran as Joseph
 Kiran Kumar as Vikral Singh
 Mohsin Memon as Raja
 Harish Patel as Lala

Soundtrack
The soundtrack of the movie was composed by the music duo Nadeem Shravan. The lyrics were written by Vishweshwar Sharma.

References

External links

1990s Hindi-language films
1992 films
Films scored by Nadeem–Shravan

Indian action films
1990s masala films